Feature Show Falls is a waterfall on an unnamed tributary of the Boulder River in Washington, United States. The falls drop directly into the Boulder River.

Feature Show Falls is often confused with Boulder Falls, which occurs on the river about 2/3 of a mile downstream from Feature Show Falls.  Most people come to Feature Show Falls and think it is Boulder Falls because Boulder Falls is marked on most maps and Feature Show is not.  Most of them don't realize when they come to this waterfall they have already passed Boulder Falls.  To see Boulder falls, one has to actually go off trail a ways before reaching Feature Show Falls and climb down to the river where the falls are.

See also
Boulder River Wilderness
Boulder River

References 
  

Waterfalls of Snohomish County, Washington
Waterfalls of Washington (state)
Segmented waterfalls